The Free International University (FIU) for Creativity and Interdisciplinary Research was a support organization founded by the German artist Joseph Beuys. He founded it together with writer Heinrich  Böll, Klaus Staeck (1st chairman), Georg Meistermann (2nd chairman) and Willi Bongard (secretary), Caroline Tisdall and Robert McDowell who wrote the FIU's feasibility report for the EC's Ralph Dahrendorf, and Enrico Wolleb, R.D. Laing, Tapio Varis, Dorothy Walker, Conrad Atkinson, Dr. Rhea Thöngens, and many others, based on principles laid down in a manifesto written by Joseph Beuys and Heinrich Böll and the 1975/6 feasibility study by art critic Caroline Tisdall. It was founded as a "organizational place of research, work, and communication" to ponder the future of society including political-economy. As a free University it was intended to supplement the state educational system with interdisciplinary work and cooperation between the sciences and the arts while at the same time campaigning for legal equality within educational systems.
 
The FIU was founded on 27 April 1973 in the Düsseldorf studio of Joseph Beuys. Major presentations of FIU occurred in Kassel Documenta (1977 & 1982), London Battersea Arts Centre (1978), Guggenheim  Museum Gallery New York (1979), Edinburgh Festival (1974, 1976, 1980), Abruzzo Italy (1984), plus conferences in Erice Sicily (1975), Cambridge (1978), and others.

The Free International University was revisited and taken further by various people and groups, including in Edinburgh (Demarco Foundation and Summerhall), Belfast (Troubled Image Group and Art & Research Exchange), and London by Robert McDowell, Richard Demarco, and Caroline Tisdall, by Renee Block, the author Rainer Rappmann under the FIU-Verlag and the F.I.U.s in Amsterdam, Antwerp, Gelsenkirchen, Hamburg, and Munich, which were begun by students of Beuys. They also include the organization Mehr Demokratie e.V. and the Omnibus for direct Democracy.

See also
 Social sculpture

Citations

References
 Susanne Anna (Ed.): Joseph Beuys, Düsseldorf, Hatje Cantz, Stadtmuseum Düsseldorf, 29 September to 30. December 2007, Ostfildern 2008, 
 Michael Ende and Joseph Beuys: Kunst und Politik – Ein Gespräch. FIU-Verlag, Wangen 1989,  
 Flensburger Hefte 24, 1789–1989 Direkte Demokratie. Interviews with Hans Peter Bull (SPD), Heiko Hoffmann (CDU), Gerald Häfner (Grüne), Joseph Beuys and Direkte Demokratie, das Kunstwerk Omnibus für Direkte Demokratie approx. 226 pages, 1989.
 Rainer Rappmann (Ed.): Denker, Künstler, Revolutionäre – Beuys, Dutschke, Schilinski, Schmundt – Vier Leben für Freiheit, Demokratie u. Sozialismus, Wangen 1996, FIU-Verlag, 
 Götz Adriani, Winfried Konnertz and Karin Thomas: Joseph Beuys; New printing, Cologne, DuMont (1994),

External links
 
 Josephbeuysraum20.com – Photos of students in the class of Beuys from 1961–1978
 F.I.U.-Amsterdam & Free International University World Art Collection
 FIU-Munich
 Freie Kunstschule Hamburg FIU (Free Art School Hamburg FIU)
 Empresas Malucaco

Joseph Beuys
1973 establishments in Germany
Educational institutions disestablished in 1988

